The 2007–08 season was Blackpool F.C.'s 100th season (97th consecutive) in the Football League. It was their first season back in the second tier of English football in 29 years. They finished nineteenth, the club's highest-place finish in the Football League in 37 years.

Ben Burgess was the club's top scorer, with ten goals overall.

Blackpool set a new club record of twelve consecutive victories, carrying over from the end of the previous season, with 0–1 and 1–0 results over Leicester City and Huddersfield Town, respectively.

At the end of the season, manager Simon Grayson released eleven players, most of whom had not featured in the first team this season, and on 30 May he confirmed that he wanted to sign at least six new players. He went on to sign twelve (including three on loan) before the start of the 2008–09 season.

First-team squad

Pre-season

Season proper

Football League Championship

League table

Results

In summary

By matchday

In detail

FA Cup

Football League Cup

Squad statistics

Players used: 29
Goals scored: 65

Transfers

Transfers in

Loans in

Transfers out

Loans out

References

Blackpool F.C. seasons
Blackpool